Cannibal Women in the Avocado Jungle of Death is a 1988 American comedy film directed by J. F. Lawton and starring Shannon Tweed and Bill Maher. The film sends up many pop culture motifs and societal trends, including feminism (and feminist movements' fragmentation around various issues), B movies (particularly Cannibal Holocaust), celebrities, major writers and political figures, centered around a spoof of Joseph Conrad's 1899 novel Heart of Darkness.  It was the first feature directed (under the pseudonym J. D. Athens) by screenwriter J. F. Lawton, who also authored Pretty Woman, Under Siege and its sequel, and television show V.I.P.

Plot
The U.S. government grows worried for the nation's avocado supply after some confrontations with the "Piranha" tribe of cannibal women, who live in the mysterious "Avocado Jungle" (westernmost outpost: San Bernardino) and ritually sacrifice and eat men. The government recruits Margo Hunt (Tweed), a professor of feminist studies at a local university called "Spritzer College" (a reference to Pitzer College but filmed at University of California, Riverside), to travel into the Avocado Jungle and make contact with the women to attempt to convince them to move to a reservation/condo in Malibu. Along the way, she and her travelling companions — male chauvinist guide Jim (Maher) and ditzy undergraduate Bunny (Karen Mistal) — meet a tribe of subservient men called the "Donnahew" (a reference to talk-show host Phil Donahue) and face dangers in their path.

Eventually, the trio (Margo, Bunny and Jim) meets the Piranha women, who have recently taken Dr. Kurtz (played by Adrienne Barbeau) as their "empress." Kurtz is Dr. Hunt's former colleague in feminist studies (the internationally famous author of Smart Women, Stupid Insensitive Men) and now her nemesis; she has joined the tribe of Piranha women with her own exploitative agenda. The two argue about the morality of sacrificing men and the exploitation of the Piranha women, and Bunny decides to join the tribe, her first sacrifice being Jim. Bunny cannot go through with the kill, however, and Dr. Hunt escapes, aided by the handsome, intelligent, and sensitive Jean-Pierre (Brett Stimely), who also was to be sacrificed.

Dr. Margo Hunt finds in the jungle a rival tribe of cannibal women, the Barracuda Women, who are at war with the Piranha women due to differences over which condiment (guacamole or clam dip) most appropriately accompanies a meal of sacrificed man. Hunt returns to the Piranha stronghold with this other tribe and rescues Bunny and Jim as well as Jean-Pierre.

Margo Hunt challenges Kurtz to a duel for supremacy, and they argue while fighting with various weapons; eventually, Margo impales Kurtz with a fencing sword. Kurtz explains her motives to Hunt in her last words:  After ruling the Piranha tribe, she cannot return to civilization and the talk-show circuit. She then kills herself by plunging into a pit filled with water and piranha fish.

Having discovered the government plot to domesticate the Piranha women by providing aerobics classes and frequent exposure to Cosmopolitan magazine, Hunt refuses to bring the Piranha women with her, and instead persuades the warring cannibal tribes to reunite, maintaining the peace by means of consciousness raising groups.

The film ends happily for the trio of main characters: Bunny and Jim are to be married, and Jean-Pierre has enrolled at Dr. Hunt's university as a feminist studies major, becoming in the process the ideal companion for Hunt.

Cast
Bill Maher as Jim
Shannon Tweed as Dr. Margo Hunt
Adrienne Barbeau as Dr. Francine Kurtz
Karen Mistal as Bunny
Barry Primus as Ford Maddox
Jim McKrell as Dean Stockwell
Pat Crawford Brown as Secretary

Release
Cannibal Women in the Avocado Jungle of Death was released on home video in March 15, 1989.

Reception 
From contemporary reviews, "Lor." of Variety found the film "pack some good laughs (and bad puns) but is unfortunately underproduced, giving Paramount Video an okay rental item."

Retrospective reviews include The Digital Fix's reviewer, who wrote:

TV Guide granted the movie 2 out of 4 stars: "This film is not nearly as bad as it might have been, thanks largely to the leads. Moreover, CANNIBAL WOMEN does manage to be on target with its humor from time to time. But there are far more misses than hits as the movie also goes for the corny, the obvious, and the ancient."

Julian White of Starburst (a British science fiction magazine), rated the movie 6 out of 10 stars, calling it "a light-hearted romp" and saying, "It's all unashamedly joky and facetious, but also very likeable. The look of the film is rough and ready ... Even the biggest fans of this film would have to admit that director J. F. Lawton is unlikely to go down in history as one of cinema's great visual stylists. That said, he's a very capable screenwriter (as he subsequently demonstrated by penning such perennial favourites as Pretty Woman and Under Siege), and there are some surprisingly sophisticated one-liners lurking among the slapstick. True, the constant ribbing at feminists now seems very dated, but it's never mean-spirited, and anyway the girls give as good as they get."

References

Sources

External links
 

1989 films
1980s comedy horror films
American parody films
Films about cannibalism
Films based on works by Joseph Conrad
Parodies of horror
1989 comedy films
Films set in jungles
Works based on Heart of Darkness
1980s English-language films
1980s American films
1989 directorial debut films